Philip Abramo (born 1945), also known as "The King of Wall Street" and "Lou Metzer", is a caporegime in the New Jersey DeCavalcante crime family who was allegedly involved in security fraud and murder. He is the capo of the DeCavalcante family's crew in Miami, Florida, United States.

Early years
Born in New York, Abramo graduated from Cardinal Hayes High School in the Bronx. One of the few Cosa Nostra mobsters to attend college, he graduated from Pace University with a degree in accounting. In 1971, he was convicted of possessing stolen property. In 1973, he was convicted of conspiracy to distribute heroin and sentenced to seven years in federal prison.

White collar crime
At some point, Abramo joined the DeCavalcante family and eventually became a made man, or full member, of the family.  He became involved in extortion, loansharking, and microcap stock fraud schemes. Abramo was the hidden control person behind Sovereign, a prominent microcap stock company and its sister trading firm, Falcon Trading. He also controlled two penny stock firms, Toluca Pacific Securities and Greenway Capital. He allegedly controlled other small-cap stock dealers through brokers and traders owing allegiance to him.

Murder
In addition to white collar crime, Abramo also allegedly committed murder. In 1989, he and other DeCavalcante family members allegedly murdered Frederick Weiss, a recycling executive and former city editor of the Staten Island Advance newspapers. The murder was a favor to Gambino crime family boss John Gotti, who feared that Weiss was cooperating with the Federal Bureau of Investigation (FBI) on a waste company investigation. In 1992, Abramo allegedly participated in the killing of DeCavalcante boss John D'Amato, suspected of homosexual acts.

As Abramo's status rose in the DeCavalcante family, he frequently served as a liaison between the DeCavalcantes and the five crime families of New York. The FBI identified him as a frequent visitor to Gotti prior to his imprisonment in 1992. Abramo is also the brother-in-law of Alan Longo, a member of the Genovese crime family.

Conviction and prison
In 1994, Abramo was indicted in New Jersey for allegedly swindling 300 people nationwide out of $1 million by selling them fraudulent lines of credit. In October 2000, he was indicted on charges of racketeering, conspiracy to murder, and securities fraud. During his trial, he made the following statement:

On July 4, 2003, Abramo was convicted of five murders, including those of D'Amato and Weiss, as well as racketeering and loan sharking charges. In 2006, he was sentenced to life in prison. In September 2008, a federal appeals court reversed his racketeering conviction and ordered a new trial. According to the Federal Bureau of Prisons, Abramo was released on January 21, 2018.

References

External links
Testimony Concerning The Involvement of Organized Crime on Wall Street by Richard H. Walker (September 13, 2000)
Crime Family Dealt a Blow, Police Say by William K. Rashbaum (October 20, 2000)
United States v. Giovanni Riggi, Philip Abramo, etc.
United States of America v. Giovanni Riggi, Philip Abramo, etc. , United States District Court of Southern District of New York
DeCavalcante Verdict
Racketeering Convictions Rejected for 3 in Mob Case By JOHN ELIGON

 

1945 births
Living people
American gangsters of Italian descent
Gangsters from New York City
Criminals from the Bronx
DeCavalcante crime family
American people convicted of murder
People convicted of racketeering
Gangsters sentenced to life imprisonment
Pace University alumni